Pierson Township may refer to the following places in the United States:

 Pierson Township, Vigo County, Indiana
 Pierson Township, Michigan

Township name disambiguation pages